Ujazdów may refer to the following places in Poland:

Ujazdów, Warsaw, a neighbourhood in Śródmieście, Warsaw
Ujazdów Avenue in Warsaw
Ujazdów Castle in Warsaw
Ujazdów Park in Warsaw
Ujazdów, Włodawa County in Lublin Voivodeship (east Poland)
Ujazdów, Zamość County in Lublin Voivodeship (east Poland)